Palooka may refer to:

 Joe Palooka, an American comic strip
 Palooka (film), a 1934 film based on the comic strip
 The Palooka, a one-act play by Tennessee Williams
 Palookas, a 1980s rock group fronted by Jowe Head
 Palooka, an unskilful player in bridge and other card games

See also
Palookaville (disambiguation)